Yongxing  is a township-level division situated in Xiuying District, Haikou, Hainan, China.

See also
List of township-level divisions of Hainan

References

Township-level divisions in Haikou